Nikolai Nikolayevich Gromov (1892–1943) was an association football player.

International career
Gromov played his only game for Russia on 14 September 1913 in a friendly against Norway.

He is said to have 'died at the front' while serving in the Second World War but other detail is lacking.

References

External links
  Profile

1892 births
1943 deaths
Russian footballers
Russia international footballers
Association football defenders
Soviet military personnel killed in World War II